UFC Fight Night: Rodríguez vs. Caceres  (also known as UFC Fight Night 92) was a mixed martial arts event produced by the Ultimate Fighting Championship held on August 6, 2016, at Vivint Arena in Salt Lake City, Utah.

Background
The event was the first that the organization has hosted in Utah.

The promotion previously scheduled an event for Salt Lake City in August 2010 for UFC Live: Jones vs. Matyushenko. However, the event was moved to San Diego, California due to lower than anticipated ticket sales in the Utah market.

A featherweight bout between The Ultimate Fighter: Latin America featherweight winner Yair Rodríguez and Alex Caceres served as the event headliner.

Brad Tavares was very briefly linked to a bout with Thales Leites at the event. However, Tavares was forced out of the fight with a rib injury and was replaced by Chris Camozzi.

Justine Kish was expected to face Maryna Moroz at the event. However, Kish pulled out of the bout on July 22 due to a spiral fracture of her finger. She was replaced six days later by promotion newcomer Danielle Taylor.

This was the last UFC event to be promoted by Frank and Lorenzo Fertitta.

Results

Bonus awards
The following fighters were awarded $50,000 bonuses:
Fight of the Night: Yair Rodríguez vs. Alex Caceres
Performance of the Night: Marcin Tybura and Teruto Ishihara

See also
List of UFC events
2016 in UFC

References

UFC Fight Night
August 2016 sports events in the United States
Mixed martial arts in Utah
Sports competitions in Salt Lake City
2016 in mixed martial arts
2016 in sports in Utah
Events in Salt Lake City